Julio César Jiménez Tejito (also spelled Giménez, born 27 August 1954 in Artigas) is a former professional footballer with Uruguayan club C.A. Peñarol and was part of the Uruguayan Squad at the World Cup in Germany in 1974. He played as a midfielder.

References

1954 births
Living people
People from Artigas Department
Uruguayan footballers
Uruguay international footballers
1974 FIFA World Cup players
Uruguayan Primera División players
Argentine Primera División players
Peñarol players
Club Atlético Vélez Sarsfield footballers
Ferro Carril Oeste footballers
San Martín de Tucumán footballers
Uruguayan expatriate footballers
Expatriate footballers in Argentina

Association football midfielders